The Asia/Oceania Zone is one of the three zones of regional Davis Cup competition in 2015.

In the Asia/Oceania Zone there are four different groups in which teams compete against each other to advance to the next group.

Draw

 relegated to Group II in 2016.
 and  advance to World Group play-off.

First round

Thailand vs. South Korea

New Zealand vs. China, P.R

Second round

Uzbekistan vs. South Korea

New Zealand vs. India

2nd Round relegation play-off

Thailand vs. China

References
 Draw

Asia Oceania Zone I
Davis Cup Asia/Oceania Zone